Jehovah's Witnesses have an active presence in most countries. These are the most recent statistics by continent, based on active members, or "publishers" as reported by the Watch Tower Society of Pennsylvania. The Watch Tower Society reports its activity in various dependencies and constituent states as separate 'lands', as noted.

Bible study figures indicate the average number of Bible studies conducted each month by Jehovah's Witness members with non-members. This includes studies conducted by Jehovah's Witness parents with their unbaptized children, which can be counted as one hour per week and one Bible study per month, per child.

Africa

North America

Caribbean

South America

Asia

Europe

Oceania

Other

In addition to the published figures for individual countries, statistics are also published collectively for countries where Jehovah's Witnesses operate covertly under ban, including several Islamic and communist states.

There are 37 sovereign states not specifically listed in the Watch Tower Society's reported statistics:

 Afghanistan
 Algeria
 Bahrain
 Bhutan
 Brunei
 China
 Comoros
 Djibouti
 Egypt
 Eritrea
 Iran
 Iraq
 Jordan
 Kuwait
 Laos
 Lebanon
 Libya
 Maldives
 Mauritania
 Monaco
 Morocco
 North Korea
 Oman
 Qatar
 Russia
 Saudi Arabia
 Singapore
 Somalia
 Syria
 Tajikistan
 Tunisia
 Turkmenistan
 United Arab Emirates
 Uzbekistan
 Vatican City
 Vietnam
 Yemen

Total

See also 
 Demographics of Jehovah's Witnesses

Notes

Sources
 2022 Country and Territory Reports, Watch Tower Bible & Tract Society of Pennsylvania.

References

External links
Jehovah's Witnesses Worldwide

 

ml:യഹോവയുടെ സാക്ഷികളുടെ സ്ഥിതിവിവര കണക്ക്